Westinghouse Works, 1904 is a collection of American short silent films, each averaging about three minutes in length. The films were taken from April 18, 1904 to May 16, 1904 in  Pittsburgh, Pennsylvania, and document various Westinghouse manufacturing plants.  They were made by G. W. "Billy" Bitzer of the American Mutoscope and Biograph Company, were shown at the Westinghouse Auditorium at the 1904 St. Louis World's Fair, and may have been made for that purpose. At least 29 films were produced and 21 remain in the collection which is now a part of the National Film Registry of the Library of Congress.

Collection 
The films in the collection of the Library of Congress are:

Assembling a generator, Westinghouse works
Assembling and testing turbines, Westinghouse works
Casting a guide box, Westinghouse works
Coil winding machines, Westinghouse works
Coil winding section E, Westinghouse works
Girls taking time checks, Westinghouse works
Girls winding armatures
Panorama exterior Westinghouse works
Panorama of Machine Co. aisle, Westinghouse works
Panorama view street car motor room
Panoramic view aisle B, Westinghouse works
Steam hammer, Westinghouse works
Steam whistle, Westinghouse works
Taping coils, Westinghouse works
Tapping a furnace, Westinghouse works
Testing a rotary, Westinghouse works
Testing large turbines, Westinghouse works
Welding the big ring
Westinghouse Air Brake Co. Westinghouse Co. works (casting scene)
Westinghouse Air Brake Co. Westinghouse Co. works (moulding scene)
Westinghouse Air Brake Co. Westinghouse works

Production 
Westinghouse executives commissioned Biograph to produce these films, intending to exhibit them to their subsidiaries and employees, thus making them some of the earliest existing examples of what are now called industrial films. They cannot be called documentaries because they were paid for and made according to guidelines set by the manufacturing company. In addition, they cannot be called commercials because they do not advertise individual products and were not exhibited widely to elicit sales.

The films were the first to use mercury vapor lamps (conveniently made by Westinghouse) to illuminate its shots, and they were also the first to use crane shots. Bitzer primarily used stationary cameras and fixed lenses, and he typically shot the films in a single continuous take.

Most films did not have title cards, so many of their names were assigned by the Library of Congress.

Release 
The finished films were shown to Westinghouse employees in Pittsburgh, narrated by a speaker. They were later exhibited at the Louisiana Purchase Exposition in St. Louis (accompanied by organ music), and were received positively by audiences.

References

External links
Inside an American Factory: Films of the Westinghouse Works, 1904

Film series introduced in 1904
1904 films
1904 short films
United States National Film Registry films
American black-and-white films
American short documentary films
American silent short films
World's fair films
Louisiana Purchase Exposition
Films set in Pittsburgh
1904 in Pennsylvania
1900s short documentary films
Short film series
1900s American films